Mrnjava was a Serbian provincial nobleman, born in Zahumlje, a frontier province in the western Serbian Kingdom. Mrnjava is the eponymous founder of the notable Mrnjavčević family; his son Vukašin Mrnjavčević became the co-ruler of the Serbian Empire (1365–1371) as king during the fall of the Serbian Empire.

Mrnjava's father was "Mrnjan" (fl. c. 1280-1289), a financial chancellor (sr. kaznac, lit. chamberlain) who served the king and queen, Stephen Uroš I and Helen of Anjou, at the court at Trebinje (in the royal province of Travunia). Mavro Orbini wrote that the family hailed from Hum, and that the poor Mrnjava and his two sons, who later lived in Blagaj, quickly rose to prominence under Stephen Uroš IV Dušan who sent for them to come to his court. Possibly, the family had left Hum, which had been part of the Serbian Kingdom, after the Bosnian conquest of Hum (1326), and settled in Livno (where Vukašin was allegedly born). The family most likely supported Dušan's Bosnian campaign (1350), in which he saw to reconquer Hum.

The name of his wife is unknown. Modern historiography has confirmed that he fathered two sons:

Uglješa Mrnjavčević (1320–1371), despot of Serres 1365–1371
Vukašin Mrnjavčević (1320-1371), Lord of the Serbian Land, of the Greeks, and of the Western Provinces (King, co-ruler of Emperor Stephen Uroš V, 1365–1371)

Mavro Orbini (mid 16th century -1614) added a third son to his descendants. This hypothesis was supported Pavel Jozef Šafárik, but no third son is acknowledged in modern historiography:
Gojko Mrnjavčević (d. 1371), logothete at the Serbian Imperial court

Notes

References

Sources
 
 
 John V.A. Fine. (1994). The Late Medieval Balkans: A Critical Survey from the Late Twelfth Century to the Ottoman Conquest. The University of Michigan Press. 
M.A. Vladislav Boskovic (2009), King Vukasin and the Disastrous Battle of Maritsa", GRIN Verlag, 
Gerald Stanley Lee (1906), "The voice of the machines: 
an introduction to the twentieth century", The Mount Tom press
George Christos Soulis (1984), "The Serbs and Byzantium during the reign of Tsar Stephen Dušan (1331-1355) and his successors", Dumbarton Oaks Library and Collection

13th-century Serbian nobility
14th-century Serbian nobility
Mrnjava
People of the Kingdom of Serbia (medieval)
Kaznac
History of the Serbs of Bosnia and Herzegovina
Trebinje
14th century in Bosnia